is an Echizen Railway Mikuni Awara Line railway station located in the city of Sakai, Fukui Prefecture, Japan.

Lines

Station layout
The station consists of one side platform serving a single bi-directional track, with a three-story station building. The station is staffed.

Adjacent stations

History
Mikuni Station was opened on December 15, 1911 as a station on the Japanese Government Railways Mikuni Line. On January 31, 1929 the Mikuni Awara Electric Railway Mikunichō Station opened adjacent to Mikuni Station. Mikunichō Station was renamed Densha-Mikuni Station on February 10, 1929. On September 1, 1942 the Keifuku Electric Railway merged with Mikuni Awara Electric Railway. Operations were halted on the Mikuni Line from October 11, 1944 and  Densha-Mikuni Station moved to JGR Mikuni Station and Keifuku took over the operations of former JGR line between Mikuni and Mikuni-Minato. The Mikuni Line officially closed on March 1, 1972, and the Echizen Main Line from June 25, 2001. The station reopened on August 10, 2003 under its present name as an Echizen Railway station.

Passenger statistics
In fiscal 2015, the station was used by an average of 415 passengers daily (boarding passengers only).

Surrounding area
The station opens onto a rotary with a small Keifuku bus terminal and taxi stand
Behind the station are steep hills; pedestrians can cross to the front entrance via a bridge, but automobile traffic must make a detour.
Other points of interest include:
Mikuni Ryushokan Museum
Mikuni Bunka Miraikan
Sakai Municipal Mikuni-Kita Elementary School
Fukui Prefectural Mikuni Senior High School

See also
 List of railway stations in Japan

References

External links

  

Railway stations in Fukui Prefecture
Railway stations in Japan opened in 1911
Mikuni Awara Line
Sakai, Fukui